Gambian–Russian relations are the bilateral relationship between the two countries, the Gambia and Russia. Both countries have established diplomatic relations on July 17, 1965.  Diplomatic relations were later established once again after the breakup of the Soviet Union.

Relations 
The Gambia maintains an embassy in Moscow, although former President Yahya Jammeh closed it for a time during the 2016–17 Gambian constitutional crisis. Russia has no corresponding embassy in Banjul, but the Russian embassy in Dakar in neighboring Senegal also represents Russian interests in the Gambia.  There is also an Honorary Consulate. The Gambia and Russia have signed a cooperative military agreement for training and a visa waiver agreement for diplomats.  the Gambia and Russia are also mutual participants in a number of international multilateral treaties and organizations. 

Since independence, the Gambia has sent students for training Soviet and Russian universities such as the Peoples' Friendship University of Russia.

See also 
 Foreign relations of the Gambia
 Foreign relations of Russia
 Romanov Empire (micronation)

References

External links 
 Embassy of the Republic of The Gambia to the Russian Federation
 Embassy of the Russian Federation in the Republic of Senegal - also responsible for Russian interests in the Gambia (in Russian)
 Honorary Consulate of Russia in The Gambia